Eskandari, also rendered as Iskandari, may refer to:

People with the surname Eskandari 
Abbas Eskandari (1897–1955) Qajar prince, and Iranian Communist politician.
Abdollah Eskandari (born 1945), Iranian make-up artist.
Abdolmajid Eskandari, Iranian academic leader
Iraj Eskandari (1908–1985), Qajar prince, and Iranian Communist politician.
Matt Eskandari (21st century), Iranian-American film director and screenwriter.
Mohammad-Reza Eskandari (20th century), Iranian politician, former Minister of Agriculture
Mohtaram Eskandari (1895–1924), Iranian intellectual and a pioneer of the Iranian women's movement.
Setareh Eskandari (born 1974), Iranian actress
Soleiman Eskandari (1875–1944), Iranian Qajar prince, and Socialist politician
Soroush Eskandari (born 1989), Iranian professional badminton player.

People with the surname Iskandari 
 Ibn Ata Allah al-Iskandari (658–709 AH), Egyptian Malikite jurist, muhaddith and the third murshid (spiritual "guide" or "master") of the Shadhili Sufi order.
 Rustam Iskandari (born 1991), Tajikistani freestyle wrestler.

Places
Eskandari, Iran, a village in Kohgiluyeh and Boyer-Ahmad Province, Iran
Eskandari-ye Baraftab, a village in Isfahan Province, Iran
Eskandari-ye Barmeyun, a village in Kohgiluyeh and Boyer-Ahmad Province, Iran
Eskandari-ye Nesa, a village in Isfahan Province, Iran